Jean Baptiste Androuet du Cerceau (1544/47–1590) was a French architect who designed the Pont Neuf (1579), spanning the Seine, Paris, and became supervisor of the royal works under Henri III and Henri IV, including the Louvre. Several hôtels particuliers are ascribed to him. The Hôtel d'Angoulême, the Hôtel de Lamoignon (1584), which houses the Historical Library of the City of Paris, and the Hôtel de Mayenne (rue St-Antoine in the Marais). The Hôtel de Mayenne, with rhythmically varied dormer windows set in a high slate roof, has the pediments of its piano nobile windows superposed on the frieze above.

According to Benezit, Reynaud presumed that Paul Androuet du Cerceau, a French goldsmith and engraver, was Jean Baptiste's son, but Paul is now thought to be the grandson of Jacques II Androuet du Cerceau.

See also
 Androuet du Cerceau for the family

References

Sources
 Baldus, Eduoard. Oeuvre de Jacques Androuet dit du Cerceau. Meubles. Paris; Edouard Baldus: c. 1880
 Benezit Dictionary of Artists (2006). Paris: Gründ. .
 Miller, Naomi (1996). "Du Cerceau. French family of artists.", vol. 9, pp. 350–354, in The Dictionary of Art, edited by Jane Turner, reprinted with minor corrections in 1998. .

External links
 George Goodall, "Besson and du Cerceau" 2005: Jacques I Androuet du Cerceau's partnership with designer and mechanician Jacques Besson
 Du Cerceau's Books on line: https://web.archive.org/web/20070420012058/http://www.cesr.univ-tours.fr/architectura/Traite/Auteur/Androuet_du_Cerceau.asp

16th-century French architects
Huguenots
1540s births
1590 deaths
Year of birth uncertain